Shaqari Island is a small islet found in northern Albania in Lake Skadar.

It is very small and is situated just opposite the village of Shiroka which stands on the largest lake in the Balkans. The island is connected to Shiroka by a bridge and there is a building on the island.

References

Lake islands of Albania
Islands of Lake Skadar
Geography of Shkodër County